Uzana may refer to:

 Uzana (Bulgaria): a locality and a ski resort in Bulgaria
 Burmese royal title
 Htilominlo: King of Pagan (1211–1235)
 Uzana of Pagan: King of Pagan (1251–1256)
 Uzana of Bassein: Governor of Pathein (c. 1270s–1287)
 Uzana II of Pagan: Viceroy of Pagan (1325–1368)
 Uzana I of Pinya: King of Pinya (1325–1340)
 Uzana II of Pinya: King of Pinya (1364)

See also 
 Usana (disambiguation)